Paper Moon may refer to:

Film and television 
 Paper Moon (film), a 1973 American film directed by Peter Bogdanovich based on the novel Addie Pray
 Paper Moon (American TV series), a 1974 American TV series
 "Paper Moon" (Supernatural), a 2014 episode of the television series Supernatural
 Paper Moon (South Korean TV series), a 2023 South Korean television series

Literature
Addie Pray, a 1971 novel by Joe David Brown later retitled Paper Moon
The Paper Moon (La Luna di Carta), a 2005 novel by Andrea Camilleri

Music
Paper Moon (band), a Canadian indie rock band
Papermoon (duo), an Austrian guitar and vocals duo
Paper Moon (album), by the Dave Brubeck Quartet, 1981
"Papermoon" (song), by Tommy heavenly6, 2008
"Paper Moon", a Greek song, "Hartino to Fengaraki", by Manos Hadjidakis
"Papermoon", a song by Our Lady Peace from Burn Burn, 2009

Other
 Paper Moon (lantern), a lantern made of thin, brightly colored paper

See also
"It's Only a Paper Moon", a 1933 jazz standard
"It's Only a Paper Moon" (Star Trek: Deep Space Nine), a television episode